Tomáš Solil (born 1 February 2000) is a Czech footballer who plays as a midfielder for Pardubice.

Club career
Solil made his professional debut for Pardubice in the Czech National Football League on 6 May 2018, starting in the home match against Třinec, which finished as a 1–0 win.

International career
In September 2020, Solil received his first call-up to the Czech Republic national team for their UEFA Nations League match against Scotland on 7 September. Due to positive SARS-CoV-2 tests in the previous Czech Republic squad, all players and the coaching staff which faced Slovakia on 4 September had to be replaced.

References

External links
 
 
 International statistics at Fotbal.cz

2000 births
Living people
Czech footballers
Czech Republic youth international footballers
Association football midfielders
FK Pardubice players
Czech National Football League players
Czech First League players
Czech Republic under-21 international footballers